Eden Burning were a popular Christian band from Cheltenham led by Paul Northup. They originally met as members of Charlton Kings Baptist church, and were active within the Christian music community between 1989 and 1996. The band's name refers to the Biblical tale of Garden of Eden burning down after Adam and Eve are banished. Cross Rhythms magazine described them as "pioneers in the evolution and creative development of British music carrying a spiritual message".

The band recorded three studio albums and two EP singles on CD as well as several audio cassette tapes and one video. There was also a live CD album, Smilingly Home, recorded in front of their home crowd at what is now the University of Gloucestershire. Subsequently, to celebrate 30 years of the Christian Greenbelt festival, they released a "Best of" album (The Hatchery 1990 – 1996).

Eden Burning toured extensively around Britain, particularly in the South and Midlands. They appeared at the Cropredy Festival in August 1995.

From January 1994 until Autumn 1996 the band produced nine issues of their newsletter, The Caper, with pictures, interviews and discussions.

All of Eden Burning's studio recordings were made at FFG studios in Cheltenham and Tewkesbury with David Pickering Pick or, for Brink, Mark Turner.

Northup later became general manager of Greenbelt Festivals Ltd. The other band members included Charlotte Ayrton, Mike Simpson, Neill Forrest (to 1992), Nive Hall (to 1995), Ben Ingram (from 1992) and John "Mowf" Mowforth (from 1995).

Albums

Thin Walls (1990) 
Cassette tape
 Track listing
 Help my Unbelief
 Thin Walls
 No Man's Land
 There was a Time
 Where did We Hide Him
 The Place I Live
 Do not be Afraid
 Things I Didn't Say
 Pictures Tell Lies
 Jericho Skies
 The Waiting

All songs by Eden Burning; Lyrics by Paul Northup except "The Waiting" by Neill Forrest.

Vinegar and Brown Paper (1992)
CD
Track listing
 My Senses Fly (PN)
 If I Go Up (NH)
 The Reel of Pickering Pick
 Speak Easy (NF)
 Different Drum
 The Weaver (David Adam)
 Feel the Rain (NF)
 Jubilee (PN)
 Simply Breathe (PN)
 Hold the Dream (NF)
 A Little More (PN)

All songs by Eden Burning; Lyrics by band members are by Paul Northup (PN), Neill Forrest (NF) or Nive Hall (NH). Also available on cassette tape. The lyrics of "Different Drum" are based on words from Psalms 120–134.

Smilingly Home (1993) 
CD (live)
Track listing
 There was a Time
 The Calling
 Much More Than Near
 Alec Murphy's
 Hold the Dream
 Medicine Bow
 Jigs and Hornpipe
 My Senses Fly
 Jubilee
 The Place I Live
 If I Go up
 The Reel of Pickering Pick
 Working Out Tomorrow
 Midnight Sun
 Feel the Rain

All songs by Eden Burning except "Medicine Bow" by the Waterboys.Also available on cassette tape.

Mirth and Matter (1994) 
CD
Track listing
 Remember When (NH)
 The Joust (PN)
 Me Comfort Still (PN)
 Sunrise (East of London) (PN/NH)
 Six Months On (PN)
 Hey Diddle Diddle (PN)
 Dependence Day (PN)
 Forgive-Me-Not (PN)
 Song for an Unknown God (PN)
 Hem Me In (PN)

The Joust featured Brian Blessed.
All songs by Eden Burning; Lyrics by band members are by Paul Northup (PN) and/or Nive Hall (NH).

Brink (1996) 
CD
Track listing
 Deep Blue Sea (3.06)
 Movers and Shakers (4.06)
 Stories (3.49)
 Almost Spent (4.05)
 Big Regret (2.53)
 Desire Lines (4.36)
 Another Country (4.13)
 With a Kiss (3.34)
 Wrap It Up (4.03)
 Western Eyes (4.30)
 Let Me Lose (7.26)

All songs by Eden Burning; all lyrics by Paul Northup.

The Hatchery 1990–1996 (2003) 
Download-only release
Track listing
 Deep Blue Sea
 Hem Me In
 Feel the Rain
 Stories
 My Senses Fly
 If I Go Up
 Let Me Lose
 Song For an Unknown God
 Much More Than Near
 There Was a Time
 Hold the Dream
 Desire Lines
 The Joust
 Jigs
 Movers and Shakers
 Six Months On
 Midnight Sun
 Never Could Play the Guitar
 Harvest Home

All of these tracks were released during Eden Burning's career, except "Never Could Play the Guitar" and "Harvest Home", both from 1996.

EP Singles

Much More than Near (1991) 
Cassette tape
 Much More than Near
 Midnight Sun
 The Calling
 Everlasting Arms

All songs by Eden Burning; Lyrics by Neill Forrest except "The Everlasting Arms" by Paul Northup.

You Could Be the Meadow (1994) 
CD
 You Could Be the Meadow
 The Brontes, Alice and Me
 Forgive-Me-Not (live)
 Matty Groves (live)

All songs written and arranged by Northup/Eden Burning except Matty Groves Trad arr Eden Burning. Also available on cassette tape.

Be an Angel (1995) 
CD
 Be an Angel
 Like in Minds
 Song for an Unknown God (live)
 Hem Me In (ambient remix) (live)

All songs written and arranged by Northup/Eden Burning. Also available on cassette tape.

Video

Through the Looking Glass (1994) 
VHS Video tape
Track listing
 The Joust
 Jigs
 Dependence Day
 Song for an Unknown God
 Jubilee
 Bones
 Hey Diddle Diddle
 Hem Me In

All songs written and arranged by Eden Burning except "Bones" by Luka Bloom.

Other cassette tapes
These are listed for completeness. They were generally available through the Caper newsletter.

Live at the Orange 19/6/94 (1995). (This is the same gig as on the video but it includes more songs)
Autumn 1995 (1995).
Live in Session on BBC Radio Leeds (1996).
Demos (nd).
Live at Last (1996).

Other tracks (including ones on compilations)
Eden Burning contributed one track to the Geoff Mann celebration CD Mannerisms in 1994, covering Mann's song "His Love". Other contributors include Pallas, IQ, Galahad, Pendragon, Jadis, and Twelfth Night.
Tracks were included on Cross Rhythms (CR) compilation tape cassettes as follows: Vol 1 (CR Issue 18) (1994) "There was a Time", Vol 3 (CR Issue 20) (1994) "Hey Diddle Diddle", and Vol 14 (CR Issue 31) (1996) "With a Kiss". 
The track "Brontes, Alice and Me" was included on the Seahorse CD compilation.

References

External links 
 Eden Burning Main site
 Eden Burning: Smilingly Home - Eden Burning includes an interview with Paul Northup where he discusses their recordings

British Christian musical groups
Musical groups established in 1989